This is a list of Ghanaian films released in 1980.

References

1980
Ghana